"Breaking the Girl" is a song by American rock band Red Hot Chili Peppers from their fifth studio album, Blood Sugar Sex Magik (1991). It was released as the fourth single from their studio album in August 1992 and is a melodic ballad that refers to a turbulent relationship between frontman Anthony Kiedis and his former girlfriend, Carmen Hawk.

Composition
"Breaking the Girl"'s bridge is marked by a percussion break that builds through the use of increasingly complex rhythms.  The percussion instruments consisted of junkyard debris found by drummer Chad Smith, guitarist John Frusciante, and bassist Flea. Frusciante's main riff was inspired by Led Zeppelin's ballads, such as "The Battle of Evermore" and "Friends". The song also makes use of a 12-string guitar and a Mellotron, using the flute patch. It is one of only six songs the group has recorded in the 6/8 time signature, the others being "Porcelain" on Californication, "Love of Your Life" and "Open/Close" from the I'm with You sessions later released on the I'm Beside You double LP compilation, "The Hunter" from The Getaway, and most recently “Tangelo” from 2022’s “Unlimited Love.” Chad Smith said in The Chad & Flea Show that his drumming in the song was inspired by Mitch Mitchell's work in the Jimi Hendrix Experience song "Manic Depression".

Music video
The music video was released on July 30, 1992, and was directed by Stéphane Sednaoui, who had previously made a video for the song "Give It Away". It makes heavy, experimental use of vibrant colors, with the background and costumes changing constantly. The band members adopt surreal appearances and behavior, with Kiedis for example having an overall Princess Leia-esque look, complete with robes and a "donut" hairstyle. The "Breaking the Girl" video is one of only two videos to feature Arik Marshall (who briefly acted as a replacement for guitarist John Frusciante) the other video being for "If You Have to Ask" – though he did not play on either track. The video also features a brief cameo by River Phoenix, who was good friends with members of the band. The woman in the video is model/actress Patricia Velásquez.

Live performances
The song was performed once on the Blood Sugar Sex Magik Tour opening date in 1991, and later reappeared in the band's setlist once in 2000 but not again until 2003. After an eight-year hiatus from being performed, the band added the song to a few setlists on their I'm with You Tour. Kiedis also briefly performed the song with The Roots during his appearance on The Tonight Show Starring Jimmy Fallon in November 2014. The song returned after a five-year hiatus from the band's setlist in January 2017 on The Getaway World Tour.

Track listings
CD and 12-inch single (1992)
 "Breaking the Girl" (edit)
 "Fela's Cock" (previously unreleased)
 "Suck My Kiss" (live)
 "I Could Have Lied" (live)

CD single version 2 (1992)
 "Breaking the Girl" (edit)
 "Suck My Kiss" (live)
 "I Could Have Lied" (live)

7-inch single (1992)
 "Breaking the Girl" (edit)
 "Fela's Cock" (unreleased)

Cassette single (1992)
 "Breaking the Girl" (edit)
 "The Power of Equality" (album version)

Personnel
Red Hot Chili Peppers
 Anthony Kiedis – lead vocals, percussion
 John Frusciante – guitars, backing vocals, percussion
 Flea – bass, percussion
 Chad Smith – drums, percussion

Additional musicians
 Brendan O'Brien – mellotron

Charts

Certifications

References

Red Hot Chili Peppers songs
1990s ballads
1991 songs
1992 singles
Music videos directed by Stéphane Sednaoui
Song recordings produced by Rick Rubin
Songs written by Anthony Kiedis
Songs written by Chad Smith
Songs written by Flea (musician)
Songs written by John Frusciante
Warner Records singles